Entente Sportive Montgeron XIII are a French Rugby league club based in Montgeron, Essonne in the Île-de-France region. Founded in 1972. The club plays in the Île-de-France regional league of the French National Division 2.

History 

In 1945 Entente Sportive Montgeronnaise were formed as a multi sports club incorporating football, athletics and basketball at the local college. A rugby league club Entente Sportive Montgeron XIII were formed in 1972 and currently runs senior, ladies and junior clubs.

See also 

National Division 2

References

External links 

 
 

1972 establishments in France
French rugby league teams
Rugby clubs established in 1972